The Golden Nugget Las Vegas is a luxury hotel and casino located in downtown Las Vegas, Nevada on the Fremont Street Experience. The property is owned and operated by Landry's, Inc. It has 2,419 hotel rooms.

History

The Golden Nugget was originally built in 1946, making it one of the oldest casinos in Las Vegas. Jackie Gaughan at one time owned a stake in the hotel as part of his many downtown properties. Steve Wynn bought a stake in the Nugget, which he increased so that, in 1973, he became the majority shareholder, and the youngest casino owner in Las Vegas. In 1977, he opened the first hotel tower and the resort earned its first four-diamond rating from Mobil Travel Guide. It was the foundation for Wynn's rise to prominence in the casino industry. Frank Sinatra periodically headlined at the Golden Nugget. 

The second hotel tower opened in 1984 along with the showroom, and the third tower was opened in 1989.

In 2000, the Golden Nugget (and all of Mirage Resorts' other properties) was sold to MGM Grand, Inc. (later named MGM Mirage).

Although the Golden Nugget was profitable, it was not part of the master expansion plan of the corporation which was focused on consolidating a long stretch of the Strip by acquiring Mandalay Resort Group, building City Center, and beginning construction in Macau. Gaming revenue on Fremont Street had peaked in fiscal year 1993. The Golden Nugget was sold in 2003, for $215 million to Poster Financial Group, owned by Timothy Poster and Thomas Breitling. When Poster Financial assumed control of the Golden Nugget, they began to upgrade the gambling operation by installing new cashless slot machines and by increasing the maximum bet available at table games to $15,000. Their story became the basis for The Casino, a television series on Fox that premiered on June 14, 2004.

On February 4, 2005, Houston, Texas-based Landry's, Inc announced its intent to purchase the property and the Golden Nugget Laughlin. The sale closed on September 27, 2005. After the purchase, the Golden Nugget embarked on a 14-month, $100 million renovation project, which was completed in November 2006. In December 2007, the Golden Nugget completed its $70 million Phase II project, which expanded the resort west onto First Street and introduced additional entertainment, event and dining venues. Phase III was the opening of the 500-room, $150 million Rush hotel Tower on November 20, 2009, along with the Chart House restaurant.

Media history

Onscreen
Films

In the Elvis Presley film, Viva Las Vegas
In the James Bond film Diamonds Are Forever (1971), the casino can be continually seen in the police chase scene.
Briefly in the Chevy Chase comedy film, Vegas Vacation
The casino can be seen in the beginning of the film Smokin' Aces (2006), in which the antagonist cuts the ribbons for the casino's grand opening.
In the film Next (2007), Nicolas Cage is briefly seen entering the Golden Nugget through the Fremont Street entrance.
The Golden Nugget features prominently in the poker mockumentary The Grand (2008).
Was seen in the music video for "Night Fever" by the Bee Gees.
Television
Alfred Hitchcock Presents 1959 episode "Man From The South", the opening shot shows the Casino and Fremont St.
The Golden Nugget and Fremont Street are in the opening scene of "The Night Stalker" (1972) with reporter Carl Kolchak investigating a series of vampire murders in Las Vegas.
Vega$ (1978-1981) showed exterior shots of The Golden Nugget in the opening and closing slots and in the pilot episode
The Casino (2004), a Fox reality television series is based on the story of the Golden Nugget'''s acquisition by Poster Financial Group.
In 2010, the casino's pool and shark aquarium were featured throughout an episode of CSI: Crime Scene Investigation.
The casino was a recurring property in Billion Dollar Buyer on CNBC.

In games
In all Street Fighter II games (except HD Remix), Balrog's (M. Bison in Japanese) stage is set in front of the Golden Nugget, with the sign clearly seen in the back. In HD Remix, it has been changed to the "Crazy Buffalo", presumably in reference to the name of Balrog's original Super Combo. The updated version of the scenario that appears in Street Fighter V changes the name of the casino to the "Golden Bullion", most likely to avoid legal issues.
The name Golden Nugget also designates several casino games: Golden Nugget (1997), Golden Nugget 64 (1998), Golden Nugget Casino (2004; Game Boy Advance), and Golden Nugget Casino DS (2006).
In Fallout: New Vegas, the logo of the "Silver Rush", formerly a gambling hall, shows a similarity to the logo of the Golden Nugget.

Attractions
The world's largest gold nugget on display, the Hand of Faith is still shown today in the Golden Nugget lobby.

The casino's large hotel sign at its entrance off Fremont and Casino Center was removed in 1984 when the casino underwent renovations.  The old sign presently sits at the YESCO signage yard.

The expanded resort is built around two aquariums. The larger faces the swimming pool and incorporates a slide through the tank containing full-grown sharks. The smaller aquarium is in the lobby of the Rush Tower. 

A total of five specialty restaurants were added: Vic & Anthony's Steakhouse,  Grotto Ristorante, Lillie's Asian Cuisine, Red Sushi and  Chart House. The Chart House has a view of one of the aquariums.  The pool is a $30 million unique three-level adventure with an enclosed slide through a shark tank, hidden grottos, swim-up bars, jacuzzis and multi-depth areas.

Golden Nugget and Poster Financial group

Tom Breitling and Tim Poster were the highest profile successful entrepreneurs who profited in the downtown market during the last crisis. As recounted in Tom Breitling's book, Double or Nothing'', the partners agreed to buy the Golden Nugget and had an agreement to sell the property after operating it for only one year. The partners made $113 million in profit, called the highest rate of return in such a short time in the gaming industry. However, the partners had a negative income for the year and the fortune was made while total revenue for downtown was still basically flat.

See also
 Golden Nugget Laughlin
 Golden Nugget Atlantic City
 Golden Nugget Lake Charles

References

External links

 
 Gordie Brown website

Golden Nugget, Las Vegas
Downtown Las Vegas
Skyscraper hotels in Las Vegas
Hotels established in 1946
1946 establishments in Nevada
Casino hotels
2005 mergers and acquisitions